Buckfast Abbey forms part of an active Benedictine monastery at Buckfast, near Buckfastleigh, Devon, England. Buckfast first became home to an abbey in 1018. The first Benedictine abbey was followed by a Savignac (later Cistercian) abbey constructed on the site of the current abbey in 1134. The monastery was surrendered for dissolution in 1539, with the monastic buildings stripped and left as ruins, before being finally demolished. The former abbey site was used as a quarry, and later became home to a Gothic mansion house.

In 1882 the site was purchased by a group of French Benedictine monks, who refounded a monastery on the site, dedicated to Saint Mary. New monastic buildings and a temporary church were constructed incorporating the existing Gothic house. Buckfast was formally reinstated as an Abbey in 1902, and the first abbot of the new institution, Boniface Natter, was blessed in 1903. Work on a new abbey church, which was constructed mostly on the footprint of the former Cistercian abbey, started in 1907. The church was consecrated in 1932 but not completed until 1938. The abbey continues to operate as a Benedictine foundation today, and is a registered charity under English law. As of 2020, the abbey has 13 monks.

History

The first abbey at Buckfast was founded as a Benedictine monastery in 1018. The abbey was believed to be founded by either Aethelweard (Aylward), Earldorman of Devon, or King Cnut. This first monastery was "small and unprosperous", and it is unknown where exactly it was located, and its existence was "precarious" especially after the Norman Conquest.

In 1134 or 1136, the abbey was established in its current position; King Stephen having granted Buckfast to the French Abbot of Savigny. This second abbey was home to Savignac monks. In 1147 the Savignac congregation merged with the Cistercian, and the abbey thereby became a Cistercian monastery. Following the conversion to the Cistercian Congregation, the abbey was rebuilt in stone. Limited excavation work undertaken in 1882 revealed that the monastery was built to the standard plan for Cistercian monasteries.

In medieval times the abbey became rich through fishing and trading in sheep wool, 
By the 14th century Buckfast was one of the wealthiest abbeys in the south-west of England. It had come to own "extensive sheep runs on Dartmoor, seventeen manors in central and south Devon, town houses in Exeter, fisheries on the Dart and the Avon, and a country house for the abbot at Kingsbridge". The Black Death killed two abbots and many monks; by the mid 1300s, there were few left to maintain the buildings, some of which collapsed. By the mid 1400s however, the abbey again flourished.

By the 16th century, the abbey was in decline. Only 22 new monks were tonsured between 1500 and 1539, and at the time of the abbey's dissolution in 1539, there were only 10 monks in residence.

Dissolution
At the time of the Dissolution of the Monasteries, the last Abbot, Gabriel Donne (d.1558), despite the solemn oaths he had taken, on 25 February 1539 together with nine others of his religious community, surrendered his abbey into the hands of Sir William Petre, as agent for King Henry VIII. On 26 April 1539 he was rewarded with a large annual pension of £120 which he enjoyed until his death. The other monks, who all co-signed the deed of surrender, also received smaller pensions.

Afterwards, 1.5 tons of gold, gilt and silver, from the treasures of the abbey, were delivered to the Tower of London. The site was granted to the King who later granted it to others, including William Petre, the Secretary of State, and Sir Thomas Denys (c.1477–1561) of Holcombe Burnell in Devon, who had married Donne's sister Elizabeth and was Chamberlain of the Household to Cardinal Wolsey.

After dissolution
Following dissolution, the abbey site and its lands were granted by the crown to Sir Thomas Denys (c.1477–1561) of Holcombe Burnell, near Exeter, who stripped the buildings and "reduced them to ruins". The abbey site was subsequently used as a stone quarry.

In 1800, the site was purchased by local mill owner, Samuel Berry. Berry had the ruins demolished, constructing a Gothic style "castellated Tudor"  mansion house, and a wool mill on the site in 1806. The Gothic house was constructed on the site of the abbey's former west cloister. The only pieces of the former abbey to escape demolition were some of the outer buildings – which were retained as farm buildings – and the tower from the former abbot's lodgings, the only part which remains to this day.

Over the next eighty years, the Buckfast site changed hands four times, finally falling into the hands of Dr. James Gale in 1872. Ten years later, Dr. Gale decided to sell the property, but was keen to offer it to a religious community. An advert was placed in The Tablet, describing the Abbey as "a grand acquisition could it be restored to its original purpose." Within six weeks of the sale, monks were again living at the abbey.

Reconstruction
In 1880 the Abbaye Sainte-Marie de la Pierre-qui-Vire was suppressed under a new French law and some of the monks went to St. Augustine's Priory in Ramsgate. The community of Ramsgate gave the French monks use of a property it owned in Leopardstown, Ireland. Learning that the property at Ramsgate was for sale, in 1882 "the whole site was purchased" by the French Benedictine monks for £4,700. On 28 October 1882, six Benedictine monks arrived at Buckfast.

Most of Samuel Berry's house was remodeled and incorporated into new claustral ranges which were built in 1882. A temporary church was constructed to the south of these new buildings, with the current abbey church constructed between 1906 and 1938, mostly on the footprint of the Cistercian Abbey (the east-end does not follow the original plan). The new abbey church was built in the "Norman Transitional and Early English" styles, to the designs of architect, Frederick Arthur Walters. There were never more than six monks working on the project at any one time, although the whole community had repaired the ancient foundations up to ground level. Construction methods were primitive: wooden scaffolding was held together by ropes and no safety protection was worn by the monks. One monk fell 50 feet but survived; and three monks fell off a hoist without serious injury in 1931. Construction continued throughout World War I: some of the monks were of German nationality, but were not sent to an internment camp on condition that they remained confined to the Abbey grounds.

Buckfast was formally reinstated as an Abbey in 1902, and Boniface Natter – who died at sea in 1906, when the SS Sirio was shipwrecked – was blessed as the new abbot on 24 February 1903. His travelling companion Anscar Vonier became the next abbot and pledged to fulfill Natter's dying wish, namely to rebuild the abbey.

The abbey church was consecrated on 25 August 1932, but the building was not finished for several years: the last stone was laid in late 1937 and final works completed the following year.

The only portion of the medieval monastery which survives is the "much restored", former abbot's tower, which dates from 14th or 15th century. This was incorporated into the abbey's guesthouse, which was constructed during 1982 and 1994, when the abbey's precinct was rebuilt.
The abbey's former well, which was located in the crypt of the former abbey and which may have dated from Saxon times, was destroyed when the new abbey was built. A church was erected and opened in March 1884. In that year, reconstruction of the south wing of the monastery began; it was intended to include a refectory and cloister.

The final phase

It was not until 25 August 1932, after most of the building had been completed, that the Abbey Church was consecrated. Reconstruction of the tower was completed in July 1937 with painting completed the following December. In 1968 Dom Charles completed the huge east window in the Blessed Sacrament Chapel. Charles employed the technique known as dalle de verre in which tiles of coloured glass are chipped into shape and laid, like a mosaic, in a matrix of resin.
 
Buckfast receives many visitors; men are lodged in the guest house belonging to the monastery, and men and women in a restored building. Various tours are offered at the site. The hair shirt of Roman Catholic Saint Thomas More is now preserved at a side altar in the Abbey. In 2017, pipe organs were being installed inside the Abbey church; the work was expected to finish in October.

The grounds

There is a conference and seminar centre, and a restaurant (the Grange). On the west side of the Abbey are two gardens with plants ranging from herbs used in cooking or medicine to poisonous plants. Behind the public area is an enclosed garden for the monks. A bridge leads over the river to the abbey farm.

Self sufficiency
The Abbey is self-supporting, with a farm where vegetables are grown and bees, pigs and cattle are kept, a shop which sells wine, honey beeswax, fudge and other items made by religious communities throughout the world, and a gift shop, book shop, and restaurant.

Buckfast Tonic Wine
The monastery's most successful product is Buckfast Tonic Wine, a fortified wine which the monks began making in the 1890s. However in 1927, the Abbey lost its licence to sell wine and as a result, the Abbot allowed wine merchants to distribute on behalf of the Abbey. At the same time, the recipe was changed to be less of a patent medicine and more of a medicated wine.

Its perceived links to violent anti-social behaviour – especially in Scotland – have been a controversial issue for the abbey which has employed a youth worker in one area affected.

Following a decision by Police Scotland to attach anti-crime labels to bottles in some areas, the distributor for Great Britain, J Chandler and Co. announced its intention to pursue legal action.

Beekeeping

Brother Adam (born Karl Kehrle in 1898 in Germany, died in 1996) was put in charge of the Abbey's beekeeping in 1919, and began extensive breeding work creating the honeybee now known as the Buckfast bee. Brother Adam had to replenish the bee colonies as 30 of the monastery's 46 colonies had been wiped out by a disease known at the time as the Isle of Wight Disease, but later called Acarine, all the bees that died were of the Old British Black bee (a now extinct British strain of the A. m. mellifera). The 16 hives that survived were descended from A. m. ligustica queens from the Ligurian Alps region of Italy. At the request of the government, Brother Adam helped in restocking the British Isles with his disease resistant Buckfast bees. Today the breeding of pedigree Buckfast bees is regulated by the Federation of European Buckfast Beekeepers (G.D.E.B.) in over twenty six countries with numerous breeders.

Buckfast bees are no longer kept at the Abbey, instead of commercial beekeeping with nearly 400 hives, today the focus at the Abbey's apiary is educational such as beekeeping courses, workshops, and honeybee experience days with their 4 hives.

Schools

Buckfast Abbey Preparatory School
From 1967 until 1994, the abbey ran a prep school for boys aged 7 to 13, but was obliged to close it as the school became financially non-viable due to dwindling numbers of boarders. Two former monks were later convicted and imprisoned for sexually abusing boys during this period.

St Boniface's Catholic College
With the outbreak of World War II, Plymouth-based St Boniface's Catholic College evacuated its pupils to Buckfast Abbey between 1941 and 1945. The school later named one of its Houses "Abbey" in memory of this period in their history.

School of the Annunciation
The School of the Annunciation was a place of learning for adults and was a charitable company based in the grounds of Buckfast Abbey. It was founded in 2014 by Dr Petroc Willey, Dr Andrew Beards, and Dr Caroline Farey, who had left the Maryvale Institute, with the Abbot of Buckfast. It offered distance learning, part-time programmes, summer schools and short courses in theology, philosophy, catechetics, sacred beauty, liturgy and other associated subjects to support the New Evangelisation. The School closed on 31 August 2019 due to a lack of funding.

Bells
The tower contains fifteen bells. There is a ring of twelve bells with a tenor weighing 41 long hundredweight (with two extra semi tone bells) surrounding the 7.5 ton bourdon bell called Hosanna. They are widely regarded as one of the finest sets of change ringing bells in the world. In August 2018, the Abbey hosted the Millennium Bell Ringing Festival in celebration of its 1000th year since the foundation of the monastery.

The bells were cast in 1935 by John Taylor and Co. and were donated by a local benefactor, Sir Robert Harvey. They are hung in the traditional change ringing style around the bourdon Hosanna. They also have an Ellacombe chiming apparatus  for single-handed ringing, but this is currently out of use.

List of abbots

Benedictine abbots
 Alwin (Aelwinus), first mentioned as having attended Shire-mote in Exeter in about 1040. Known from the Domesday Book of 1086 to have been Abbot in 1066.
 Eustace, first mentioned in 1143 in a Totnes Deed. He was Abbot when Buckfast was affiliated to the Abbey of Cîteaux (Cistercian).

Cistercian abbots
Buckfast still followed the Rule of St. Benedict, as the Cistercians also live by that Rule.
 William acted as Papal Legate in 1190.
 Nicholas elected in 1205.
 Michael mentioned in the Cartulary of Buckfast Abbey (C.B.A.) in 1223.
 Peter (I) mentioned in the C.B.A. 1242.
 William (II) mentioned in the C.B.A. 1249.
 Howell mentioned in the Leger Book (L.B.) of Buckfast (Brit. Mus.) – no dates.
 Henry mentioned in C.B.A. 1264 and 1269.
 Simon mentioned in C.B.A. and Petre Archives (P.A.) between 1273 and 1280.
 Robert mentioned in L.B. and Exeter Episcopal Registers (Ep. Reg.) between 1280 and 1283.
 Peter de Colepitte mentioned in the P.A. between 1291 and 1313
 Robert II mentioned in the Ep. Reg. 1316.
 William Atte Slade mentioned in the Banco Rolls 1327.
 Stephen I mentioned in the Ep. Reg. 1328.
 John of Churchstowe mentioned in the Ep. Reg. 1332.
 William Gifford mentioned in the Ep. Reg. 1333.
 Stephen of Cornwall mentioned in the Ep. Reg. 1348.
 Philip (Beaumont) mentioned in the Ep. Reg. 1349.
 Robert Symons mentioned in the Ep. Reg. and P.A. between 1355 and 1390.
 William Paderstow mentioned in the Ep. Reg and P.A. 1395.
 William Slade mentioned in the Ep. Reg 1401 and 1415.
 William Beaghe mentioned in the Ep. Reg. and P.A. between 1415 and 1432.
 Thomas Roger mentioned in Ep. Reg. and P.A. He was Prior Administrator c. 1422 – 1432, and blessed as Abbot in 1432.
 John Ffytchett mentioned in the Ep. Reg. 1440.
 John Matthu (Matthew) mentioned in the Ep. Reg. 1449.
 John King mentioned in the Statuta Cap. Gen. Ord. Cist. from 1464 to 1498.
 John Rede (I) mentioned in the Ep. Reg. 1498.
 John Bleworthy mentioned in 1505 – Cal. of Early Chancery Proceedings, also in Powderham MSS.
 Alfred Gyll mentioned in the Ep. Reg. 1512.
 John Rede (II) mentioned in the Ep. Reg. 1525. There is no record of death or resignation from his office.
 Gabriel Donne (died 1558) (alias Dunne), who was appointed by the Bishop of Exeter with the encouragement of Thomas Cromwell in 1535. He surrendered the Abbey to the king on 25 February 1539.

Benedictine abbots
Monastic life was restored at Buckfast in 1882; it became an abbey, under the direction of an abbot, in 1902.
 Very Rev Dom Thomas Duperou – Superior: 1882 – 1884 (became Abbot of Sacred Heart, USA)
 Very Rev Dom Leander Lemoine – Superior: 1884 – 1885
 Very Rev Dom Benedict Gariador – Prior: August 1885 – February 1899
 Very Rev Dom Leander Lemoine – Superior: March 1899
 Very Rev Dom Ignatius Jean – Superior: April 1899 – March 1900 (not a Monk of Buckfast)
 Very Rev Dom Leander Lemoine – Superior: March 1900 – July 1902 (was also Abbot Visitor)
 Very Rev Dom Savinian Louismet – Superior: July 1902 – November 1902
 Right Rev Dom Boniface Natter – Abbot: elected 19 November 1902. Died 4 August 1906.
 Right Rev Dom Anscar Vonier – Elected 14 September 1906. Died 26 December 1938.
 Right Rev Dom Bruno Fehrenbacher elected 10 January 1939. Resigned 1956. Titular Abbot of Tavistock till his death on 18 July 1965.
 Right Rev Dom Placid Hooper elected 5 January 1957. Ruling Abbot till 1976. Titular Abbot of Tavistock till his death on 11 December 1995
 Right Rev Dom Leo Smith elected 30 January 1976. Ruling Abbot till 1992. Titular Abbot of Colchester till his death on 10 July 1998
 Right Rev Roger David Charlesworth elected 3 January 1992. Ruling Abbot till 1999. Titular Abbot of Malmesbury.
 The Very Rev Sebastian Wolff appointed Prior Administrator in January 2000
 Right Rev Dom William Philip William Manahan elected Abbot 10 December 2003. Resigned December 2006 and was convicted and imprisoned for child sex abuse.
 Right Rev Dom Richard Yeo appointed Abbot Administrator February 2007 until January 2009
 Right Rev Dom Roger David Charlesworth re-elected Abbot 27 January 2009. January 2018 appointed Abbot Administrator after the community failed to elect an Abbot.
 Very Rev Dom Gavin Francis Straw OSB appointed Prior Administrator March 2019.
 Right Rev Dom Roger David Charlesworth re-elected Abbot 09 April 2021.

Gallery

See also
 Charles Norris (artist)
 Buckfastleigh
 St Boniface's Catholic College
 Dartmoor crosses
 English Benedictine Congregation
 List of monastic houses in Devon
 List of monastic houses in England

References

General sources
 
 Clutterbuck, Robin Buckfast Abbey – A History 
 Heald, Claire "Binge drinking — the Benedictine connection", BBC News, 26 September 2006, retrieved 8 October 2006.
 St Boniface's Catholic College Historical Archives – 1951

External links
 Buckfast Abbey
 Buckfast Abbey Images

1018 establishments in England
Anglo-Saxon monastic houses
1539 disestablishments in England
Benedictine monasteries in England
Christian monasteries established in the 11th century
Roman Catholic churches in Devon
Cistercian monasteries in England
Monasteries in Devon
Monasteries of the English Benedictine Congregation
Religious organizations established in 1882
Tourist attractions in Devon
19th-century Christian monasteries
Charities based in England
Frederick Walters buildings
Monasteries dissolved under the English Reformation
Buckfastleigh
19th-century Roman Catholic church buildings in the United Kingdom